Archduke Gottfried of Austria (14 March 1902 – 21 January 1984), also styled as Gottfried Erzherzog von Österreich, was a member of the Tuscan line of the House of Habsburg-Lorraine, an Archduke of Austria, and Prince of Hungary and Bohemia. Gottfried assumed the title of titular Grand Duke of Tuscany, in spite of his grandfather Ferdinand IV's abdication of 1870.

Family
Gottfried was born in Linz, Austria-Hungary, the eldest child and son of Archduke Peter Ferdinand of Austria and his wife Princess Maria Cristina of Bourbon-Two Sicilies. Gottfried was raised with his three siblings in Salzburg and Vienna until the end of World War I in 1918, when his family emigrated to Lucerne, Switzerland. He died in Bad Ischl, aged 81.

Marriage and issue
Gottfried married Princess Dorothea of Bavaria, fifth child and fourth daughter of Prince Franz of Bavaria and his wife Princess Isabella Antonie of Croÿ, on 2 August 1938 civilly and religiously on 3 August 1938 in Sárvár, Kingdom of Hungary. Gottfried and Dorothea had issue:

Archduchess Elisabeth of Austria, Princess of Tuscany (born 2 October 1939 in Achberg), married on 28 April 1965 in Salzburg, Friedrich Hubert Edler von Braun (born 26 December 1934 in Regensburg), son of Erich Edler von Braun and Baroness Elisabeth von Teuchert-Kauffmann und Traunsteinburg. They have three children:
Bernadette Edle von Braun (born 21 July 1966 in Bad Godesberg), she has illegitimate issue
Dominik Edler von Braun (born 21 September 1967 in Bad Godesberg), married on 25 August 1995 in New York City, Countess Tatiana Angela von Nayhauss-Cormons (born 5 May 1968 in Munich), daughter of Count Mainhardt von Nayhauss-Cormons and Sabine Beirlein. They have three children:
Justus Edler von Braun (born 15 May 2003 in Bonn)
Ludovic Edler von Braun (born 20 September 2005 in Bonn)
Edina Edler von Braun (born 15 November 2007 in Bonn)
Felix Edler von Braun (born 23 April 1970 in Bad Ischl), married on 27 May 2006 in Berlin, Gabrielle Hinzmann (born 15 August 1972 in Berlin). They have one daughter:
Stella Edler von Braun (born in 2009)
Archduchess Alice of Austria, Princess of Tuscany (born 29 April 1941 in Leutstetten), married on 7 May 1970 in Salzburg, Baron Vittorio Manno (born 31 July 1938 in Cuneo), son of Baron Antonio Manno and Bonile Maria Asinari di Rossillon. They have two children:
Leopoldo dei baroni Manno (19 February 1971 in The Hague — 21 February 1971 in The Hague)
Niccolò dei baroni Manno (born 1 November 1977 in Maisons-Laffitte), married on 22 May 2004 in London, Manon Sybille Duflos. They have three children:
Arturo dei baroni Manno (born in 2009)
Paolo dei baroni Manno (born in 2012)
Alessio dei baroni Manno (born in 2014)
Domitilla dei baronni Manno (born 30 April 1974 in Neuilly-sur-Seine), married on 24 April 1999 in Salzburg, Pierre-Emmanuel Derriks (born 30 August 1973 in Ixelles), son of Michel Derriks and Anne Mottard. They have four children:
Felicie Derriks (born 27 July 1998 in Salzburg)
Ombeline Derriks (born 29 February 2000 in Munich)
Fleur Derriks (born 28 March 2003)
Corentin Derriks (born 16 March 2005)
Archduke Leopold of Austria, Prince of Tuscany (born 25 October 1942 in Leutstetten - died 23 June 2021), married on 19 June 1965 in St. Gilgen, Laetitia de Belzunce d'Arenberg (born 2 September 1941 in Brummana), daughter of Henry de Belzunce and Marie-Thérèse de la Poëze d'Harambure. They had two sons.
Archduchess Maria Antoinette of Austria, Princess of Tuscany (born 16 September 1950 in St. Gilgen), married on 13 April 1974 in St. Gilgen, Baron Hans Walter von Proff zu Irnich (born 7 March 1938 in Munich), son of Oskar Natterman and Margarete Wutt, adopted by his stepfather Baron Max von Proff zu Irnich. They have two children:
Baron Maximilian von Proff zu Irnich (born 24 February 1976 in Munich), married on 29 May 2010, Baroness Sidonia von Ledebur (born 5 November 1978 in Darmstadt), daughter of Baron Ernst von Ledebur and Alix von Watzdorf. They have one son:
Baron Cornelius von Proff zu Irnich (born 11 August 2011)
Baroness Johanna von Proff zu Irnich (born 27 June 1979 in Munich), married on 1 October 2011 in Starnberg, Florian Prechtl. They have two children:
Franz Prechtl (born in January 2013)
A child (born in 2015)

Honours
Knight of the Austrian Order of the Golden Fleece

Ancestry

References

|-

1902 births
1984 deaths
20th-century Austrian people
House of Habsburg-Lorraine
People from Linz
Knights of the Golden Fleece of Austria
Grand Masters of the Order of Saint Joseph
Austrian princes